Scott Bergold (born November 19, 1961) is a former player in the National Football League (NFL). He was drafted in the second round of the 1985 NFL Draft by the St. Louis Cardinals and played that season with the team.

References

Players of American football from Milwaukee
St. Louis Cardinals (football) players
Wisconsin Badgers football players
1961 births
Living people
American football defensive tackles